Circle of Lovers is a 1927 German silent drama film directed by Rudolf Walther-Fein and Rudolf Dworsky and starring Hans Mierendorff, Marcella Albani, and Charlotte Ander. It was shot at the Staaken Studios in Berlin. The film's sets were by art director Jacek Rotmil.

Cast

References

Bibliography
 Grange, William. Cultural Chronicle of the Weimar Republic. Scarecrow Press, 2008.

External links 
 

1927 films
Films of the Weimar Republic
German silent feature films
Films directed by Rudolf Walther-Fein
German black-and-white films
Films based on Austrian novels
1920s German films
Films shot at Staaken Studios
1927 drama films
German drama films